In Buddhism, acinteyya (Pali), "imponderable" or "incomprehensible,"  (Sanskrit: अव्याकृत, Pali: , "unfathomable, unexpounded,"), and atakkāvacara, "beyond the sphere of reason," are unanswerable questions or undeclared questions. They are sets of questions that should not be thought about, and which the Buddha refused to answer, since this distracts from practice, and hinders the attainment of liberation. Various sets can be found within the Pali and Sanskrit texts, with four, and ten (Pali texts) or fourteen (Sanskrit texts) unaswerable questions.

Etymology
The Sanskrit word acintya means "incomprehensible, surpassing thought, unthinkable, beyond thought." In Indian philosophy, acinteyya is 

It is also defined as 

The term is used to describe the ultimate reality that is beyond all conceptualization. Thoughts here-about should not be pursued, because they are not conducive to the attainment of liberation. 

Synonymous terms are avyākṛta "indeterminate questions," and atakkāvacara, "beyond the sphere of reason."

Atakkāvacara
Nirvana is atakkāvacara, "beyond logical reasoning". It is difficult to comprehend with logic or reason, since it is not a concrete "thing." It cannot be explained with logic or reason to someone who has not attained it by themselves.

Acinteyya - four imponderables
The four imponderables are identified in the Acintita Sutta, Anguttara Nikaya 4.77, as follows:
 The Buddha-range of the Buddhas [i.e., the range of powers a Buddha develops as a result of becoming a Buddha];
 The jhana-range of one absorbed in jhana [i.e., the range of powers that one may obtain while absorbed in jhana];
 The [precise working out of the] results of kamma (Karma in Sanskrit);
 Speculation about [the origin, etc., of] the cosmos is an imponderable that is not to be speculated about (SN 56.41 develops this speculation as the ten indeterminate).

Avyākṛta

Ten indeterminate questions
The Cula-Malunkyovada Sutta, MN 63 and 72 contains a list of ten unanswered questions about certain views (ditthi):
The world is eternal.
The world is not eternal.
The world is (spatially) infinite.
The world is not (spatially) infinite.
The being imbued with a life force is identical with the body.
The being imbued with a life force is not identical with the body.
The Tathagata (a perfectly enlightened being) exists after death.
The Tathagata does not exist after death.
The Tathagata both exists and does not exist after death.
The Tathagata neither exists nor does not exist after death.

In the Aggi-Vacchagotta Sutta, "Discourse to Vatsagotra on the [Simile of] Fire," Majjhima Nikaya 72, the Buddha is questioned by Vatsagotra on the "ten indeterminate question:" avyākrta 
 Is the cosmos eternal, non-eternal, finite, infinite?
 Are the soul and the body (jīvam & sarīram) similar or different?
 After death, a Tathagata exists, does not exist, both exists and does not exist, neither exists nor does not exist?

The Buddha refuses to answer the questions, avoiding getting entangled in debate, but answers with a simile:

Fourteen questions
1. Is the world eternal?
2. ...or not?
3. ...or both?
4. ...or neither?
(Pali texts omit "both" and "neither")

5. Is the world finite?
6. ...or not?
7. ...or both?
8. ...or neither?
(Pali texts omit "both" and "neither")

9. Is the self identical with the body?
10. ...or is it different from the body?

11. Does the Tathagata (Buddha) exist after death?
12. ...or not?
13. ...or both?
14. ...or neither?

Sixteen questions - Sabbasava-Sutta
The Sabbasava Sutta (Majjhima Nikaya 2) also mentions 16 questions which are seen as "unwise reflection" and lead to attachment to views relating to a self.

What am I?
How am I?
Am I?
Am I not?
Did I exist in the past?
Did I not exist in the past?
What was I in the past?
How was I in the past?
Having been what, did I become what in the past?
Shall I exist in future?
Shall I not exist in future?
What shall I be in future?
How shall I be in future?
Having been what, shall I become what in future?
Whence came this person?
Whither will he go?

The Buddha states that it is unwise to be attached to both views of having and perceiving a self and views about not having a self. Any view which sees the self as "permanent, stable, everlasting, unchanging, remaining the same for ever and ever" is "becoming enmeshed in views, a jungle of views, a wilderness of views; scuffling in views, the agitation (struggle) of views, the fetter of views."

Hindrance to liberation
Pondering over the four acinteyya is a hindrance to the attainment of liberation. Sacca-samyutta, "The Four Noble Truths", Samyutta Nikaya 56:

And the Aggi-Vacchagotta Sutta, "Discourse to Vatsagotra on the [Simile of] Fire," Majjhima Nikaya 72:

The Buddha further warns that

See also
 Noble Silence
 Similarities between Pyrrhonism and Buddhism
 Kant's antinomies
 Acatalepsy

References

Sources
Printed sources

 
 
 
 
 
 
 

Web-sources

External links
Kaccayanagotta Sutta: To Kaccayana Gotta (on Right View)
Cula-Malunkyovada Sutta: The Shorter Instructions to Malunkya
Aggi-Vacchagotta Sutta: To Vacchagotta on Fire
Peter Della Santina, The Tree of Enlightenment: An Introduction to the Major Traditions of Buddhism, Philosophy and Psychology in the Abhidharma
Text of the Cula Malunkyaputta Sutta

Further reading
Karunadasa, Yakupitiyage (2007). The Unanswered Questions: Why were They Unanswered? A Re-examination of the Textual Data, Pacific World: Third Series 9, 3-31  
Nicholson, Hugh (2012). Unanswered Questions and the Limits of Knowledge, Journal of Indian Philosophy 40 (5), 533-552

Buddhist cosmology
Buddhist philosophical concepts
Karma in Buddhism